Exeter Book Riddle 83 (according to the numbering of the Anglo-Saxon Poetic Records) is one of the Old English riddles found in the later tenth-century Exeter Book. Its interpretation has occasioned a range of scholarly investigations, but it is taken to mean 'Ore/Gold/Metal', with most commentators preferring 'precious metal' or 'gold', and John D. Niles arguing specifically for the Old English solution ōra, meaning both 'ore' and 'a kind of silver coin'.

Text and translation

As edited by Williamson, the riddle reads:

Interpretation

Interpretation has focused on whether the riddle alludes to biblical figures, prominently Tubal-cain, though allusions to fallen angels have also been envisaged.

Analogues

The principal analogue noted in past work is Riddle 91 in the collection by Symphosius on 'money':

Editions

 Krapp, George Philip and Elliott Van Kirk Dobbie (eds), The Exeter Book, The Anglo-Saxon Poetic Records, 3 (New York: Columbia University Press, 1936), p. 236, https://web.archive.org/web/20181206091232/http://ota.ox.ac.uk/desc/3009.
 Williamson, Craig (ed.), The Old English Riddles of the Exeter Book (Chapel Hill: University of North Carolina Press, 1977), p. 112 [no. 79].
 Muir, Bernard J. (ed.), The Exeter Anthology of Old English Poetry: An Edition of Exeter Dean and Chapter MS 3501, 2nd edn, 2 vols (Exeter: Exeter University Press, 2000).

Recordings

 Michael D. C. Drout, 'Riddle 83', Anglo-Saxon Aloud (19 November 2007) (performed from the Anglo-Saxon Poetic Records edition).

References

Riddles
Old English literature
Old English poetry